Ecofont is the name of a TrueType font family, an application program for Windows, and a Dutch business firm.

Ecofont Vera Sans (originally called Eco Sans) was developed by SPRANQ in the Netherlands in order to reduce ink consumption when printing. Each character in the font contains tiny holes. SPRANQ claims that this reduces the amount of ink needed by approximately 15 percent when compared to the Vera Sans family on which Ecofont Sans is based.

The Ecofont application program (formerly marketed as "Ecofont Professional") inserts small holes in other fonts in order to reduce ink consumption.

Both the software and the Ecofont Sans fonts are distributed and sold by Ecofont BV, based in Utrecht.

History 

Ecofont Vera Sans was originally designed as an ink saving alternative to the Verdana typeface.

Ecofont Vera Sans saved 20% more ink when compared to Bitstream Vera Sans in a 2010 test. However, both sans-serif fonts used more ink than most typical serif fonts.

In 2011, Ecofont claimed that a reproducible test comparing Arial with Ecofont Arial showed ink savings of 28%.

Awards 

The Eco Sans font received the European Environmental Design Award 2010 from DiMAD in Spain.

Ecofont received the Accenture Innovation Award 2011 in the category Consumer Products, the Sprout Challenger Award in 2012  and the SMEs Innovation Top 100 in 2013.

References

External links 

 

Display typefaces
Printing and the environment
Sans-serif typefaces
Typefaces and fonts introduced in 2009